An Election to the Edinburgh Corporation was held on 5 November 1895, alongside municipal elections across Scotland, and the wider British local elections. Contests took place in 2 of the cities 13 wards, with candidates in the remaining 11 being returned unopposed. The election was relatively quiet, with no particularly important issues being raised.

Aggregate results

Ward Results

References

1895
1895 Scottish local elections
November 1895 events